Hovorbis rodriguezensis is a species of air-breathing freshwater snail, an aquatic pulmonate gastropod mollusk in the family Planorbidae, the ram's horn snails and their allies.

Distribution
This species is endemic to Mauritius.

This species' generic name was first changed to Africanogyrus in 2007.

References

 Brown D.S. (1994). Freshwater snails of Africa and their medical importance. London: Taylor and Francis, 607 p.

External links
 Crosse H. (1873). Diagnoses molluscorum novorum. Journal de Conchyliologie. 21: 136-144.

rodriguezensis
Gastropods described in 1873
Taxonomy articles created by Polbot
Endemic fauna of Mauritius
Taxobox binomials not recognized by IUCN